The 2022 FC Tulsa season is the franchise's 8th season in the USL Championship, the second-tier professional soccer league in the United States.  The team will also participate in the 2022 U.S. Open Cup.

Club

Staff
 James Cannon – President
 Michael Nsien – Head Coach (through June 17, 2022)
 Donovan Ricketts – Interim Head Coach (starting June 17, 2022), First Assistant Coach (through June 17, 2022)
 Nemanja Vuković – Assistant Coach
 Cyprian Hedrick – Assistant Coach
 Johnathon Millwee – Head Athletic Trainer

Competitions

Preseason

USL Championship

Standings — Eastern Conference

Match results

U.S. Open Cup

References

Tulsa Roughnecks
FC Tulsa
FC Tulsa
FC Tulsa